Giovanni Battista Brostoloni (born c. 1726) was an Italian engraver, born in Venice. He was a pupil of Joseph Wagner. He engraved two Portraits of Pope Benedict XIV and a St. Theresa in Adoration. He also produced twenty vedute of Venice (1763) and twelve large plates of Ceremonies of the Election of Doge and his Marriage with Adriatic –all after Canaletto.

References

1726 births
Italian engravers
Painters from Venice
Year of death missing